Living torpedoes (also Straceńcy — “Desperates” or "the Lost") was a social and military phenomenon which began in the Second Polish Republic in mid-1939, when the threat from Nazi Germany became real. The idea for creating the human torpedo unit was very similar to the famous Japanese kamikaze pilots — people willing to sacrifice their lives to defend their homeland. It is a matter of debate among military historians whether there were any real plans for the combat usage of such suicidal units, or whether it was purely a matter of propaganda.

History

On May 5, 1939, Adolf Hitler officially demanded the Free City of Danzig and the Polish Corridor. A day after Hitler’s speech, the Polish daily Ilustrowany Kurier Codzienny from Kraków published a letter written by a man from Warsaw named Władysław Bożyczko and also signed by his relatives, the brothers Edward and Leon Lutostański. Bożyczko together with the Lutostański brothers appealed to the Poles, asking them to sacrifice their lives. Also, as early as spring 1937 a man from Katowice, Stanisław Chojecki, had written a letter to Edward Rydz-Śmigły, offering a similar ultimate sacrifice.

The appeal quickly spread all over the country, trumpeted by other newspapers and radio. Copies of several papers which published it have been preserved to this day; in some of them there are names and photographs of some of those who applied. The search for volunteers turned into a popular patriotic movement which lasted until the first day of World War II — September 1, 1939, the day the German invasion of Poland began. It is now difficult to estimate how many people volunteered; most probably there were as many as 4700 men and some 150 women (3000 names are documented, as the Polish Navy issued special IDs for volunteers, signed by Commodore Eugeniusz Poplawski). The first people took their oaths on June 29, 1939.

It is not exactly known what the Polish Army was going to use these people for. Presumably, they were supposed to man underwater human torpedoes, aimed at the destruction of German warships. Most probably, the Polish Army did not have the necessary equipment, but reportedly in the summer of 1939 in Gdynia, 83 selected volunteers were shown a special short movie about torpedoes manned by humans. An officer of the Navy who was present stated that Poland had 16 such torpedoes; they were eight meters long and weighed 420 kilograms. However, none of the volunteers ever saw these torpedoes. Some other volunteers were trained as glider pilots and parachute jumpers.

Also, at that time the Polish Navy created a Bureau of Living Torpedoes, which suggests that the idea was treated seriously. According to one of the volunteers, Marian Kamiński from Poznań, who saw the movie, Navy officers told him to return to Gdynia on October 12, 1939, for a two-month training course. The course never started — as Germany attacked Poland on September 1, 1939 — but some of the volunteers had by then been drafted into another special ops unit for sabotage and operations behind enemy lines.

Volunteers
On Tuesday, June 13, 1939, Ilustrowany Kurier Codzienny published a list of volunteers, adding that new names were added to it on daily basis. In several previous issues of the paper, other lists were published, with hundreds of names altogether. Among people presented in the June 13 issue are such names, as Tadeusz Gierat from Wola Duchacka, Krakow, who wrote: "My life belongs to you, my homeland", or Emilia Konopnicka from Tarnopol, who wrote: "My father died in the war, and my Polish honor tells me to apply". Bolesław Sobczyk from Gdynia wrote: "At any given moment I am willing to give my life for Poland", while J.F. from Trembowla wrote: "I am over 50 years old, and I think that people like me are the best candidates". Among volunteers there also was a group of coal miners from Nowa Wieś in Polish Upper Silesia.

Letters from volunteers
In the spring and summer of 1939, numerous letters from those willing to sacrifice their lives for Poland were printed in the newspapers. Here are excerpts from those letters:
Ilustrowany Kurier Codzienny May 27, 1939: "There is a constant flow of letters to our office, sent by those who want to volunteer. There are so many of them, that it is impossible to present all names. At the same time, plenty of those volunteers have asked us not to present their names, as they are not searching for fame. So far more than 1000 applied, in recent days we have had 311 letters, including 23 from women".
Ilustrowany Kurier Codzienny May 27, 1939: "Miss A.B. from Zakopane. I have seen a war, I served for 5 months by the frontline, also served in 1919 and 1920-21. I was one of the youngest Legionnaires, and now, when it is necessary, I am sacrificing my life",
Ilustrowany Kurier Codzienny May 27, 1939: "A retired man from Lwow. I am free now, I can do whatever I want with myself. I am 60, I am not able to march with a carbine for a long time, but I am feeling good enough to learn how to operate a torpedo and thus saving at least one young life",
Ilustrowany Kurier Codzienny May 27, 1939: "40-year old lady named Z.B. from Brzesko. I want to emphasize that I already have a volunteer son in the Navy, second son is also going to the army. I am requesting immediate addition of my name to the list of volunteers",
Ilustrowany Kurier Codzienny May 27, 1939: "Maksymilian K. from Lwow. I am Jewish, I love my fatherland, so I am volunteering to the death battalion",
Kurier Poranny June 20, 1939: "Among huge number of volunteers for the living torpedoes, there is a German man, named Karol Lange, who is a farmer living in the Bydgoszcz county. He had been a member of a German organization, but withdrew from it, because, as he says, it is impossible for him to be a loyal citizen of Poland and a member of such organization at the same time".

See also
Błotniak
Kamikaze
Kaiten

References

  Komenda Marynarki Wojennej — "ŻYWE TORPEDY"
  Tomasz Zając, Polskie żywe torpedy, Portal o2.pl, 007-03-23
 Narcyz Klatka, "Polskie żywe torpedy w 1939 r.", GDW — Gdański Dom Wydawniczy Sp. z o.o.  
  Andrzej Sowa, "Kronika 1939 roku", Dom Wydawniczy Bellona, Warszawa 2000. 

1939 in Poland
Suicide weapons